Mark Tremmel (born August 27, 1971) is an American politician in the state of Iowa.

Tremmel was born in North English, Iowa and attended Georgetown University and University of Chicago Law School. A Democrat, he served in the Iowa House of Representatives from 2001 to 2003 (93rd district).

References

1971 births
Living people
People from North English, Iowa
Georgetown University alumni
Iowa lawyers
Democratic Party members of the Iowa House of Representatives
21st-century American politicians